Velikoknyazevka is a rural locality (a selo) and the administrative center of Velikoknyazevsky Selsoviet of Belogorsky District, Amur Oblast, Russia. The population was 755 as of 2018. There are 8 streets.

Geography 
Velikoknyazevka is located 51 km west of Belogorsk (the district's administrative centre) by road. Novoandreyevka is the nearest rural locality.

References 

Rural localities in Belogorsky District